Chasing Classic Cars is a US television documentary series presented by Wayne Carini of F-40 Motorsports and produced by Clint Stinchcomb. It looks at classic cars from all eras, focusing on finding and getting cars running, with the option of restoration and a likely sale. The series is aired on Motor Trend.

The series shows the restoration and auction process, and not all projects are financially successful. It has featured cars which have not previously been shown in public for decades.

Episodes

References

External links

 

2000s American documentary television series
2010s American documentary television series
2008 American television series debuts
Motor Trend (TV network) original programming
English-language television shows
Automotive television series
Conservation and restoration of vehicles